Chaudhry Muhammad Ashraf  may refer to:

 Muhammad Ashraf (politician, born 1946), Pakistani politician
 Muhammad Ashraf (politician, born 1935), Pakistani politician
 Chaudhry Muhammad Ashraf (senator, 1901–1983), Pakistani politician